Schoeck Peak  is a peak of  standing directly at the head of Henderson Glacier in the Enterprise Hills, Heritage Range in Antarctica. It was mapped by the United States Geological Survey (USGS) from surveys and U.S. Navy air photos from 1961 to 1966. It was named by the Advisory Committee on Antarctic Names (US-ACAN) for Peter A. Schoeck, an auroral scientist at Little America V Station in 1957.

References

Mountains of Ellsworth Land